Víctor Cabrera may refer to:

 Víctor Cabrera (Argentine footballer) (born 1993), Argentine football defender
 Víctor Cabrera (Chilean footballer) (born 1957), Chilean former footballer
 Víctor Hugo Cabrera (born 1968), Colombian actor
 Víctor Cabrera, member of the Dominican reggaeton production duo Luny Tunes